Mountain Park Elementary School can refer to:

Mountain Park Elementary, New Jersey, a school located in Berkeley Heights, New Jersey.
Mountain Park Elementary, Georgia (U.S. State), a school located in Roswell, Georgia